This is a list of members of the Australian Senate following the 2016 Australian federal election held on 2 July 2016. The election was held as a consequence of a double dissolution in which both houses of parliament were dissolved. Ordinarily, only half of the senators terms end at each election. In this case, all 76 senators were elected. At the first sitting following the election, half of the senators representing each of the six states of Australia were allocated six-year terms to end on 30 June 2022, with the remainder allocated three-year terms to end on 30 June 2019. The terms of senators from the Australian Capital Territory and the Northern Territory end on the day of the next federal election.

In accordance with section 13 of the Constitution, it was left to the Senate to decide which senators were allocated six- and three-year terms. The senate resolved that the first elected six of twelve senators in each state would serve six-year terms, while the other six elected in each state would serve three-year terms. This had been the Senate practice on all seven previous occasions that required allocation of long and short terms. In 1983 the Joint Select Committee on Electoral Reform had unanimously recommended an alternative "recount" method to reflect proportional representation, and section 282 of the Commonwealth Electoral Act was added in 1984 to provide for a recount on that basis. This alternative method had been supported by both major parties in senate resolutions passed in 1998 and 2010. Despite the previous resolutions, an agreement between 's Mathias Cormann and 's Penny Wong led the Senate to choose the order-elected method again. As a result, in New South Wales, Labor's Deborah O'Neill got a six-year term at the expense of The Greens' Lee Rhiannon getting a three-year term, while in Victoria Liberal's Scott Ryan got a six-year term at the expense of the Justice Party's Derryn Hinch getting a three-year term. Both methods of allocation had the same outcome for all other senators.

Notes

References

Members of Australian parliaments by term
21st-century Australian politicians
Australian Senate lists
2010s politics-related lists